Neogastropoda is an order of sea snails, both freshwater and marine gastropod molluscs.

Description 

The available fossil record of Neogastropoda is relatively complete, and supports a widely accepted evolutionary scenario of an Early Cretaceous origin of the group followed by two rapid diversification rounds in the late Cretaceous and the Paleocene.

These sea snails only have one auricle, one kidney and one monopectinate gill, i.e. the gill filaments develop on only one side of the central axis.

The shell has a well-developed siphonal canal. The elongated trunk-like siphon is an extensible tube, formed from a fold in the mantle. It is used to suck water into the mantle cavity. At the base of the siphon is the bipectinate (branching from a central axis) osphradium, a sensory receptacle and olfactory organ, that is more developed than the one in the Mesogastropoda. They achieved important morphological changes including e.g., the elongation of the siphonal canal, a shift in the mouth opening to a terminal position on the head, and the formation of a well-developed proboscis.

The nervous system is very concentrated. Many species have the ganglia in a compact space.

The rachiglossate (rasp-like) radula, a layer of serially arranged teeth within the mouth, has only three denticles (small teeth) in each transverse row.

The Neogastropoda have separate sexes.

There are about 16,000 species. Neogastropoda includes many well-known gastropods including the cone snails, conchs, mud snails, olive snails, oyster drills, tulip shells, and whelks. The Neogastropoda all live in the sea, except Clea, and Rivomarginella that are freshwater genera. The neogastropods are most diverse in tropical seas. They are mostly predators, but some are saprophagous (scavengers).

Taxonomy 
According to the taxonomy of the Gastropoda by Bouchet & Rocroi (2005) the clade Neogastropoda consists of these superfamilies:
 Buccinoidea Rafinesque, 1815
 Conoidea Fleming, 1822
 Cancellarioidea Forbes & Hanley, 1851: since 2017 treated as the superfamily Volutoidea Rafinesque, 1815
 Mitroidea Swainson, 1831 : added in 2017 
 Muricoidea Rafinesque, 1815
 Olivoidea Latreille, 1825
 †  Cossmann, 1896 
 Pseudolivoidea (de Gregorio, 1880): since 2017 treated as a synonym of the superfamily Olivoidea Latreille, 1825
 Turbinelloidea Rafinesque, 1815
 Volutoidea Rafinesque, 1815

When Neogastropoda was an order, it was placed within the prosobranch gastropods according to the taxonomy developed by Thiele (1921). The families which used to form the order Neogastropoda are now included in the clade Neogastropoda Cox, 1960.

Ever since Thiele (1929), Neogastropoda have been considered a natural group, clearly differentiated from other Caenogastropoda. The monophyly of the group is widely accepted among morphologists, and it is based on several synapomorphies mostly related with the anatomy of the digestive system. Current classifications of Neogastropoda generally recognize up to six superfamilies: Buccinoidea, Muricoidea, Olivoidea, Pseudolivoidea, Conoidea, and Cancellarioidea. Phylogenetic relationships among neogastropod superfamilies based on morphological characters are rather unstable, and for instance, Cancellarioidea or Buccinoidea have been alternatively proposed as the sister group of the remaining Neogastropoda.

Families
According to the taxonomy of the Gastropoda by Bouchet & Rocroi (2005) the taxonomy of clade  Neogastropoda is as follows:
Unassigned to a superfamily
 † Family Johnwyattiidae
 † Family Perissityidae
 † Family Sarganidae
 † Family Speightiidae
 † Family Taiomidae
 † Family Weeksiidae
Superfamily Buccinoidea
Family Belomitridae Kantor, Puillandre, Rivasseau & Bouchet, 2012
Family Buccinidae
Family Busyconidae Wade, 1917 (1867) 
Family Colubrariidae
Family Columbellidae
 † Family  Petuch, 1994 
Family Fasciolariidae
Family Melongenidae
Family Nassariidae
 Superfamily Mitroidea Swainson, 1831
Family Charitodoronidae Fedosov, Herrmann, Kantor & Bouchet, 2018
Family Mitridae
Family Pyramimitridae Cossmann, 1901
Superfamily Muricoidea
Family Muricidae
Family Babyloniidae
Family Costellariidae
Family Cystiscidae
Family Harpidae
Family Marginellidae
 † Family Pholidotomidae
Family Pleioptygmatidae
Family Strepsiduridae
Family Turbinellidae
Family Volutidae
Family Volutomitridae
Superfamily Olivoidea
Family Olividae
Family Olivellidae
Superfamily Pseudolivoidea: since 2017 treated as a synonym of the superfamily Olivoidea Latreille, 1825
Family Pseudolividae
Family Ptychatractidae
Superfamily Conoidea
Family Conidae
Family Clavatulidae
Family Drilliidae
Family Pseudomelatomidae
Family Strictispiridae
Family Terebridae
Family Turridae
Superfamily Cancellarioidea: since 2017 treated as the superfamily Volutoidea Rafinesque, 1815
Family Cancellariidae

References
This article incorporates CC BY 2.0 text from the reference.

 Bandel, K. & Dockery, D.T. III (2012): Protoconch characters of Late Cretaceous Latrogastropoda (Neogastropoda and Neomesogastropoda) as an aid in the reconstruction of the phylogeny of the Neogastropoda. – Freiberger Forschungshefte, C 542 psf (20): 93-128, pls. 1-5.

External links 
 Neogastropod Tree of Life
 Crame J. A. (2013). "Early Cenozoic Differentiation of Polar Marine Faunas". PLoS ONE 8(1): e54139. 

 
Extant Early Cretaceous first appearances
Protostome unranked clades